The Bozeman National Fish Hatchery, now known as Bozeman Fish Technology Center, is located about  northeast of Bozeman, Montana, at the entrance to Bridger Canyon. Fish Technology Centers work with a wide variety of public and private partners to improve and conserve aquatic resources. Both the Fish Technology Center and the Fish Health Center are part of the National Fish Hatchery System, operated by the United States Fish and Wildlife Service. There are seven Fish Technology Centers and nine Fish Health Centers in the United States. The Bozeman hatchery is the fourth oldest National Fish Hatchery. The hatchery was named to the National Register of Historic Places on January 6, 1983.

The Bozeman National Fish Hatchery was authorized by an act of the United States Congress on August 5, 1892. Construction of facilities began April 1895 and was completed in late 1896. The first superintendent, Dr. Chase Tucker, began working there on January 11, 1897. The hatchery's original focus was on brook trout and rainbow trout (steelhead). The hatchery grew steadily and an additional  were purchased in 1905. The fish hatchery focus ceased in 1966 when the hatchery became a Fish Cultural Development Center with a focus on improving Salmonidae culture. The focus changed again to cover a wider variety of fish species when it became a Fish Technology Center in 1983. Today, the center is more of a research and education center than a hatchery.

A significant accomplishment of the center was its instrumental role in getting the greenback cutthroat trout's rating under the Endangered Species Act changed from extinct to threatened. In August 2004 a new  laboratory and administrative building known as the Robert G. Piper Building was opened, named in honor of a former director of the center. The Bozeman Fish Technology Center currently studies aquatic species culture, aquatic species nutrition, fishery evaluation, and aquatic species health in the states of Montana, North Dakota, South Dakota, Wyoming, Nebraska, Utah, Colorado, and Kansas.

See also 
 List of National Fish Hatcheries in the United States
 National Register of Historic Places listings in Gallatin County, Montana

References

External links 

 Bozeman Fish Technology Center - official site

Government buildings on the National Register of Historic Places in Montana
Queen Anne architecture in Montana
Shingle Style architecture in Montana
Infrastructure completed in 1896
National Fish Hatcheries of the United States
Agricultural buildings and structures on the National Register of Historic Places in Montana
National Register of Historic Places in Gallatin County, Montana
1896 establishments in Montana